Acrymia is a genus of plants in the family Lamiaceae, first described in 1908. Only one species is known, Acrymia ajugiflora, found in the Perak and Selangor regions of Malaysia.

References

Lamiaceae
Endemic flora of Peninsular Malaysia
Monotypic Lamiaceae genera